Eidothea is a genus of rainforest plants.

Eidothea may also refer to:

Eidothea (Greek myth), several women in Greek mythology
Campylocephalus, a genus of eurypterid first described as Eidothea